Anna  is a 1951 Italian melodrama film directed by Alberto Lattuada and starring the same trio as Bitter Rice: Silvana Mangano as Anna, the sinner who becomes a nun, Raf Vallone as Andrea, the rich man who loves her, and Vittorio Gassman as Vittorio, the wicked waiter who sets Anna on a dangerous path.

Silvana Mangano's real sister, Patrizia Mangano, acts as Anna's sister in the film. Sophia Loren has a small uncredited role as a nightclub assistant. Future film directors Franco Brusati and Dino Risi co-wrote the script.

The film features the songs "Non Dimenticar" and "El Negro Zumbón", a baião popularised in the US as "Anna" and recorded much later by Pink Martini.

Plot
A man (Vallone) suffers a car accident. He's taken to hospital, where Sister Anna (Mangano) takes care of him. The man is the reason Anna became a nun. She remembers the days she was leading a life of sin as a night club singer.

Reception
Anna is one of the greatest box office successes of Italian cinema. "El Negro Zumbón" became a classic in Italy and Spain. Nanni Moretti paid a tribute in Dear Diary, in which the song is shown on a TV, and the opening of the song is featured in Cinema Paradiso.

Dubbed voices
In the original Italian version, the voices of many actors in the film are dubbed:
Silvana Mangano: Lydia Simoneschi
Vittorio Gassman: Gualtiero De Angelis
Raf Vallone: Mario Pisu
Gaby Morlay: Tina Lattanzi
Tina Lattanzi appears in the film as Andrea's mother, and she is dubbed by Giovanna Scotto.
Other voices heard in this film are: Emilio Cigoli, Giuseppe Rinaldi, Rosetta Calavetta and Miranda Bonansea.

External links
 

Films set in Italy
Films set in Milan
1951 films
Films scored by Nino Rota
1950s Italian-language films
1951 drama films
Italian black-and-white films
Films directed by Alberto Lattuada
Films about Catholic nuns
Italian drama films
Melodrama films
1950s Italian films